Borommakot or Maha Thammarachathirat II was the king of Ayutthaya from 1733 to 1758. His reign was the last blooming period of Ayutthaya as the kingdom would fall nine years after his death.

"His reign of 25 years is important for being the last peaceful period of Ayudhya during which literature with the arts and crafts flurished."  However, the king himself was known for "cruelty to people and animals alike," with seven of his sons meeting violent deaths.

Much of what survives in Ayutthaya today dates back to Borommakot's massive renovations of Ayutthaya temples in the second quarter of the 18th century. King Rama I attempted to emulate the religious customs of Ayutthaya during Borommakot's reign in the early Bangkok period and even postponed his coronation until he was certain that his coronation was confidently modelled off of Borommakot's coronation.

Ayutthya civil war
Prince Phon was the son of Sanpet VIII. His elder brother, Prince Phet, succeeded the throne as Sanphet IX (Thai Sa) in 1708. Phon was then appointed as the Front Palace. However, Thai Sa decided that upon his death the throne would be given to his second eldest son, Prince Aphai, since Thai Sa's eldest son had entered the priesthood. In 1732, Thai Sa died and a civil war commenced. Phon led his armies against his nephews, Prince Aphai and Prince Paramet. The civil war within Ayutthaya was "a big fight, bigger than any which had occurred in Siam in former times". With the victory ensured, Phon executed his nephews, the government civil servant allies, and took the throne as King Borommakot.

Accession to the throne and rule
Because the Samuha Kalahom had lent the support to Prince Aphai, Borommakot removed the power of Samuha Kalahom by depriving its authorities over southern Siam and transferred the power to Kromma Tha instead. The Samuha Kalahom remained as a mere military figurehead.

In spite of the bloodshed that preceded his reign, Borommakot was known for his reconstruction of Buddhist temples and the peace and prosperity Ayutthaya finally enjoyed again. In 1753, Borommakot sent two Siamese monks to rehabilitate Theravada Buddhism in Sri Lanka.

In 1741, Borommakot made his son Thammathibet the Front Palace. Thammathibet proved to be an able prince and was also known for being a poet. However, Thammathibet had affairs with two of Borommakot's concubines, Princess Sangwan and Princess Nim—a severe crime. The lovers were caught in 1746 and the three were beaten. The Front Palace was lashed 120 stokes and the two concubines 30 each. The Front Palace died while he was beaten and Princess Sangwan died 3 days later. Princess Nim survived, but she was banished from the court.

Borommakot then appointed his third son, Duea (later became Uthumphon), as the Front Palace. Borommakot skipped his second son, Ekkathat, because he thought that Ekkathat was not suitable to be a king.

However, Ekkathat still had designs on the throne, and the subsequent struggles of the princes for the throne would contribute to the fall of Ayutthaya in 1767, during the reign of Ekkathat.

Renovation projects 

Borommakot dramatically transformed the skyline of Ayutthaya, much of what survives in Ayutthaya today dates from his reign. 

Wihan Phra Mongkhon Bophit underwent major renovations by Borommakot, resulting in its current wihan design. Heavily damaged by the Burmese sack in 1767, the wihan was completely restored in the 20th century.

King Borommakot renovated both Wat Mahathat, Phitsanulok, and Wat Mahathat Thung Yang, as according to the Ayutthaya chronicles. The Ayutthaya Royal Palace and Wat Phu Khao Thong was also the scene of massive renovations partaken by Borommakot.

Legacy 
Boromakot was revered by the later Bangkok aristocracy for his religious reforms at attempting to solve the issues of social turmoil, something which the later Bangkok aristocracy would attempt to implement in the Rattanakosin Kingdom under King Rama I's reign.

Rama I attempted to emulate the religious customs of Ayutthaya during Borommakot's reign in the early Bangkok period and even postponed his coronation until he was certain that his coronation was confidently modelled off of Borommakot's coronation.

Issue

Ancestry

Notes

|-

|-

1680s births
1758 deaths
Ban Phlu Luang dynasty
Kings of Ayutthaya
18th-century monarchs in Asia
Front Palaces
Rear Palaces
Thai male Chao Fa 
Princes of Ayutthaya
17th-century Thai people
18th-century Thai people
18th-century Thai monarchs